Year 1007 (MVII) was a common year starting on Wednesday (link will display the full calendar) of the Julian calendar.

Events 
 By place 

 England 
 King Æthelred the Unready pays the Danish Vikings a sum of 36,000 pounds of silver (Danegeld) to stop further invasions.

 Ireland 
 The Book of Kells is stolen from the Abbey of Kells.

 Japan 
 January 1 (New Year’s Day) – Imperial Princess Shushi is granted the title Ippon Shinno (first rank princess).
 January 29 – Ranking ceremony of Murasaki Shikibu – as a renowned writer and lady-in-waiting, tutor of Empress Shōshi, she is elevated to the highest position in the palace below the empress.
 April – Imperial Prince Tomohira receives the title nihon (second rank prince).

 By topic 

 Religion 
 November 1 – King Henry II of Germany founds the Archdiocese of Bamberg during a synod held in Frankfurt.
 Ælfheah of Canterbury travels to Rome to receive his pallium – symbol of his status as an archbishop – from Pope John XVIII.
 The Keraites, a Turco-Mongolian tribe, are converted to Nestorianism (a sect of Christianity).

Births 
 Emeric, Hungarian prince and co-heir (approximate date)
 Gervais de Château-du-Loir, French nobleman (d. 1067)
 Giselbert, count of Luxembourg (approximate date)
 Hugh Magnus (Hugues le Grand), king of France (d. 1025)
 Ibn Sidah, Andalusian linguist and lexicographer (d. 1066)
 Isaac I Komnenos, Byzantine emperor (approximate date)
 Maitripada, Indian Buddhist philosopher (d. 1085)
 Ouyang Xiu, Chinese historian and poet (d. 1072)
 Peter Damian, cardinal-bishop of Ostia (d. 1073)
 Welf III, duke of Carinthia (approximate date)

Deaths 
 February 27 – Ælfwaru, English noblewoman
 March 20 – Abu Rakwa, Andalusian Umayyad prince 
 July 21 – Gisela of Burgundy, duchess of Bavaria
 October 31 – Heriger, abbot of Lobbes (Belgium)
 Attilanus, bishop of Zamora (Spain) (b. 937)
 Badi' al-Zaman al-Hamadani, Persian poet (b. 969)
 Guo, empress of the Song Dynasty (b. 975)
 Manjutakin, Fatimid general and governor
 Maslama al-Majriti, Andalusian chemist
 Pelayo Rodríguez, count (comes) of León 
 Sebestyén, archbishop of Esztergom
 Urraca Fernández, Galician queen

References